Trend Following: Learn to Make Millions in Up or Down Markets is an international bestseller written by Michael Covel. It is about the investment strategy known as trend following, which uses the market trend mechanism and benefits from both sides of the market, enjoying profits from ups and downs of the stock or futures markets.

Release and reception
The book was an international bestseller, with the publisher reporting over 100,000 copies sold to date. It was named top book about trading and commodity markets for last 15 years.

References

External links
 Trend Following

Business books
2009 non-fiction books